Amaranthus caudatus (also known as Amaranthus edulis and Amaranthus mantegazzianus) is a species of annual flowering plant. It goes by common names such as love-lies-bleeding, pendant amaranth, tassel flower, velvet flower, foxtail amaranth, and quilete.

To the Quechua people of South America,  A. caudatus is referred to as kiwicha, quihuicha, inca jataco; ataco, ataku, sankurachi, jaguarcha (Ecuador), millmi, or coimi. While to the Aymara people, who are native to the Andes and Altiplano regions of South America, A. caudatus is known as qamasa.

Many parts of the plant, including the leaves and seeds, are edible, and are frequently used as a source of food in India as well as in South America, where it is the most important Andean species of Amaranthus, known as kiwicha. (See also amaranth seed and Andean ancient plants.) This species, as with many other amaranths, is originally from the American tropics. The exact origin is unknown, as A. caudatus is believed to be a wild Amaranthus hybridus aggregate. In indigenous agriculture, A. cruentus is the Central American counterpart to South American A. caudatus.

Introduction

Description 
A. caudatus is most recognizable for its striking flowering panicles that can reach up to 90 cm long. The colour of these highly dense flowering panicles ranges can be black, red and more commonly white. The red varieties of  A. caudatus are due to a high content of betacyanins. 

Each panicle is self-pollinating and the fruits each contain a single small seed, no larger than 1 mm in diameter. Like quinoa, each seed has a shiny coat and the embryo is curved around the small endosperm. The panicles grow from lateral buds and from the main stem.

A. caudatus is an annual, broad-leaved dicotyledon with a central stem that grows from a taproot system. Depending on the variety, A. caudatus can reach up to 2.5 m tall. Leaves and side branches grow outward from the central stem and may start as low as the base of the plant.

Etymology 
During the Victorian era, specific flowers had different meanings. Love-lies-bleeding stood for hopeless love or hopelessness in the Victorian language of flowers.

History 
A. caudatus is originally from Central and South America and was used as a staple grain by the Inca, Maya and Aztec civilizations. Because of its high nutritional value, it was culturally considered as a beneficial food for children and elderly. 

A. caudatus was very important for Aztec people. They believed that kiwicha had the power to give strength to people that eat it. 
This food was not only used for royalty diet but also in religious rituals. A. caudatus was mixed with honey and human blood and eaten during ceremonies, including human sacrifices. For these reasons, around the 1500s when the conquistadores came, they prohibited the use of the plant and was almost completely banned from these regions. Around the 1800s, A. caudatus slowly started to be cultivated again.

Because of its late reuse, due to its history, A. caudatus cultivation is still very localized in America. However, the interest in the cultivation of A. caudatus outside the Andes is increasing again.

Natural distribution 
A. caudatus is an indigenous crop from the high Peruvian Andes that has been cultivated for thousands of years by many cultures including the Incas. It is the only Amaranth species that can grow at altitudes greater than 2,500 meters above the sea level. Despite the fact that A. caudatus had been a well-adapted staple in the Andean region for millennia and had offered substantial nutritional advantages to the native people, when the Spanish came in the 1500s, they replaced A. caudatus cultivations with wheat and barley. However, because of its great nutritional content, A. caudatus is regaining popularity and returning to compete with modern crops. Although A. caudatus is seldom recognized outside of the Andes, significant plantings have been observed in Mexico, China, Nepal, India and Kenya.

Cultivation 
In most parts of its habitat, A. caudatus can easily grow between 1 and 2.5 meters and grows best in full sun within 4-6 months. However, in some highland regions they can take up to 10 months. It is a summer annual C4 plant. A. caudatus grows from Ecuador to northern Argentina mostly in mild areas or in the valleys of the Andes. Despite its geographical adaptability, it is a short-day plant and needs adequate moisture. Cultivation can occur at up to 3100 m. a.s.l. and once established it is drought tolerant and can handle both wet and dry conditions. If the cultivation takes place in subtropical climates, it can be harvested up to two times. Loam and loam-sandy soils with lots of organic matter and good drainage are best. Clay soils are not recommended for A. caudatus. In addition, the pH must be between 6-7, although the plant can still grow at a pH of up to 8.5.

The crop is planted by transfer, with the help of seedlings in fields or by direct drilling at the beginning of the rainy season. They are cut at a height of 10 to 55 cm and the cultivation practices are similar to those of corn: ear emergence, two-stage fertilization and weed control. In the Andes of Peru, Bolivia, Ecuador and Argentina, the plant is grown in the traditional way on non-irrigated land without fertilizers. The seeds are very small, so soil preparation is important, such as breaking up of clods and shaking up. It is recommended to plough the soil, harrow and make furrows either in the traditional way with a yoke or by machine.

Weed control takes place manually with pricking out. In the absence of rain, irrigation is necessary every 30 days and especially in flowering and grain filling stages. Harvesting is done before full maturity of the plant. In this process, the plants are cut 50 cm above the ground. They are collected in furrows until they dry and then hit with sticks. In this process, they are placed on clothing or tamped floors for threshing and sieved so that the seeds can be separated from the dead leaves. Improvement of cultivation consists in proper soil preparation and direct sowing of selected seeds at a density of 4 to 6 kg/ha in 80 cm wide furrows, using fertilizers according to the nutrient content of the soil. The yield varies between 2000 and 5000 kg/ha in Peru and 900 to 4000 kg/ha in Ecuador.

Genetics  
All species of amaranth have a diploid chromosome set but a different number of chromosomes. In A. caudatus the number is 2n = 32.

Pests and diseases 
The most common diseases affecting the seeds are Pythium spp. and Fusarium spp. Fungal diseases such as Sclerotinia spp. and Alternaria spp. cause stem and root rot. The most common pest is Diabrotica spp, also known as Loritos, which can damage the plant during emergence. Other pests include Agrotis spp. and Eupicata spp. Blister beetles (Epicauta adspersa) and red weed caterpillar (Loxostege bifidalis) were also found in some countries. They caused severe defoliation of the upper leaves. These pests are controlled by the application of 1.5% diatomaceous earth.

Food

Nutrition 
The flavourful and gluten-free A. caudatus is very high in protein and essential amino acids, such as lysine, which are typically deficient in plant protein. In terms of nutritional content, A. caudatus protein is virtually similar to milk protein (casein), and it complements the nutritional quality of foods derived from flours of corn, rice, or wheat. As a result, A. caudatus is particularly beneficial for infants, children, and pregnant and lactating women, but also vegetarians and vegans.

A. caudatus is high in dietary fiber and minerals such as iron, magnesium and manganese. Its frequent consumption could help to reduce hypertension and cholesterol. A. caudatus has also been found to have anthelmintic, antinociceptive, antipyretic, anticancer, antiallergenic, antidiabetic, immune system stimulation, cardioprotective, hepatoprotective, and antibacterial properties.

Culinary use and dishes 

There are several uses of kiwicha. When ground, it can be used as flour but also as breading for sweets and main dishes when crushed. Seeds can be popped as popcorn on a pan and, like oats, can be eaten with milk as cereals.

In Mexico, A. caudatus is used on sweets with honey and the dish is called "alegria" (meaning "happiness" in Spanish), India has a similar dish called "ladoos". A. caudatus is slowly making its way outside of Latin America. Cookies and other breakfast food made of kiwicha can be found for example in stores in the United States. Even though kiwicha is gluten free, adding kiwicha flour to wheat when producing leavened food increase the nutritional value of the bread. As flour, A. caudatus is also used for pasta and noodles formation.

Nowadays, and because of its nutritional values, some scientists explored the substitution of some vegetables by amaranth leaves in kenyan traditional dishes and investigated if the vitamins and minerals remain when boiled for instance. Depending on the vegetables used in the mix, minerals and iron uptake can be improved.

Other uses

Animal feed 
After the A. caudatus grains have been removed, the remaining plant material (stover) can be used for fodder. During dry seasons when forage is limited, fodder from A. caudatus stover would be an essential source of animal feed for Andean farmers to maintain their livestock.

Additionally, A. caudatus can be suitable to be used as a high-protein forage crop in the tropics.

Natural dye 
In Peru, simple methods have been developed to extract Betalain from red varieties of A. caudatus to be used as non-toxic red food colouring. For some applications, this natural dye may be used to replace the use of synthetic dyes. However natural dyes tend to have a lower colour fastness and therefore may not function well as a direct substitution.

References

External links

 Information from University of Wisconsin
 Article about role of Amaranths in native American agriculture
 Jepson Manual Treatment
 Ecoport token for Amaranthus caudatus L.
 "Wild Food Plants Attracting Additional Consumer Categories": Amaranthus caudatus (Famine Food Guide website)
 
 Amaranthus caudatus L. Medicinal Plant Images Database (School of Chinese Medicine, Hong Kong Baptist University)  
 Crops for the Future: Kiwicha (Amaranthus caudatus)
 

caudatus
Crops originating from South America
Flora of South America
Flora of the Cerrado
Plants described in 1753
Taxa named by Carl Linnaeus
Garden plants of South America
Leaf vegetables
Pseudocereals